Ravi Teja (born 19 October 1994) is an Indian cricketer. He made his Twenty20 debut for Hyderabad in the 2016–17 Inter State Twenty-20 Tournament on 29 January 2017. He made his first-class debut for Hyderabad in the 2017–18 Ranji Trophy on 1 November 2017, scoring fifty and taking five wickets in the first match which also earned him Player of the Match award. He made his List A debut for Hyderabad in the 2017–18 Vijay Hazare Trophy on 5 February 2018.

References

External links
 

1994 births
Living people
Indian cricketers
Hyderabad cricketers
Cricketers from Hyderabad, India